The Maevarano Formation is a Late Cretaceous sedimentary rock formation found in the Mahajanga Province of northwestern Madagascar. It is most likely Maastrichtian in age, and records a seasonal, semiarid environment with rivers that had greatly varying discharges. Notable animal fossils recovered include the theropod dinosaur Majungasaurus, the early bird Vorona, the paravian Rahonavis, the titanosaurian sauropod Rapetosaurus, and the giant frog Beelzebufo.

Description 
The Maevarano Formation is well exposed in the Mahajanga Basin, in particular near the village of Berivotra near the northwestern coast of the island where its outcrops have been heavily dissected by erosion. At the time it was being deposited, its latitude was between 30°S and 25°S as Madagascar drifted northward after splitting from India about 88 million years ago. It is composed of three smaller units or members. The lowest is the Masorobe Member, which is usually reddish and is at least . Its rocks are mostly poorly sorted coarse-grained sandstones with some finer-grained beds. It is separated by an erosional disconformity from the next member, the Anembalemba Member. The lower portion of the Anembalemba Member is fine to coarse clay-rich sandstone, whitish or light grey in color, with cross-bedding. The upper portion of this member is made of poorly sorted clay-rich sandstone, light olive-grey in color, that lacks cross-bedding. Most vertebrate fossils come from the Anembalemba Member, especially from the upper portion. Elsewhere, it is replaced by the marine Berivotra Formation. The Miadana Member is made up of claystone, siltstone, and sandstone, lacks cross-bedding, and has several colors of rock. The Maevarano Formation as a whole is underlain by the Marovoay beds and capped by the Berivotra Formation.

The age of the Maevarano Formation has been debated; the Berivotra Formation, which is partially contemporaneous with the upper portions of the formation, shows that at least the upper part of the Maevarano is Maastrichtian in age. There is no evidence that it is Campanian, despite previous reports to that effect. The Berivotra Formation appears to include near its top a magnetic reversal, interpreted as the shift from Chron 30N to Chron 29R, which occurred approximately 65.8 million years ago (about 300,000 years before the Cretaceous–Paleogene boundary and associated Cretaceous–Paleogene extinction event. This suggests that Maevarano organisms also lived shortly before (geologically speaking)  the extinction event.

History of exploration 
The Maevarano Formation was first explored by French military physician Dr. Félix Salètes and his staff officer Landillon in 1895, and fossils and geologic data were sent to paleontologist Charles Depéret.  He briefly described the formation and named two dinosaurs from the remains (Titanosaurus madagascariensis and Megalosaurus crenatissimus, now Majungasaurus). Similar collections were made throughout the 20th century, yielding mostly fragmentary fossils; one such specimen, a rough partial skull roof, became the holotype of supposed pachycephalosaur (bonehead dinosaur) Majungatholus in 1979. (This specimen was later shown to be part of the skull ornamentation of a Majungasaurus.) Large-scale expeditions (seven to date), under the banner of the Mahajanga Basin Project, began in 1993.  These expeditions, conducted jointly by Stony Brook University and the University of Antananarivo, have greatly expanded knowledge of this formation and the organisms that lived while it was being deposited.

Paleoenvironment 

The Maevarano Formation is interpreted as a low-relief alluvial plain that over time was covered by a marine transgression.  Broad, shallow rivers flowed to the northwest from central highlands; evidence for debris flows suggests that the discharges of the rivers varied greatly, with periods of dilute water flow, and periods of rapid erosion dumping sediment into the channels. Paleosols are reddish and include root casts.  The paleosols and other sedimentologic evidence indicate well-drained floodplains with abundant vegetation adapted to a relatively dry climate, strongly seasonal (rainy and dry seasons) and at times semiarid (not unlike the present climate of the area).

Paleofauna 
Animals found in the formation include frogs (including Beelzebufo ampinga), turtles, snakes, lizards, at least seven species of crocodyliforms (including species of Mahajangasuchus and Trematochampsa), abelisaurid theropods Majungasaurus, noasaurid Masiakasaurus, two types of titanosaurian sauropods (Rapetosaurus and Vahiny), and at least five species of bird-like dinosaurs, including Rahonavis. Crocodyliforms were very diverse and abundant.

Invertebrates

Osteichthyes

Amphibians

Dinosaurs 
Indeterminate Lithostrotia remains formerly attributed to Titanosauridae. Undescribed Lithostrotia form. Indeterminate Enantiornithes remains. A rich avifauna with several undescribed taxa are known, including pengornithid enantiornithes and putative omnivoropterygids.

Crocodylomorphs

Squamates

Turtles

Mammals 
Mammal remains include an undescribed gondwanathere, a broken tooth UA 8699, which has been interpreted both as metatherian and as eutherian, a non-gondwanathere multituberculate tooth fragment, a non-gondwanathere multituberculate femur, and a yet undescribed mammal known from an articulated skeleton. Some taxa are particularly large sized herbivores, exemplifying the diversity of Mesozoic mammals.

See also 
 Lists of fossiliferous stratigraphic units in Africa
 List of fossiliferous stratigraphic units in Madagascar
 Geology of Madagascar

References

Bibliography 
 
     
  
 
  
  
  
   
  

 
Geologic formations of Madagascar
Upper Cretaceous Series of Africa
Cretaceous Madagascar
Maastrichtian Stage
Sandstone formations
Shale formations
Alluvial deposits
Deltaic deposits
Fluvial deposits
Lacustrine deposits
Paleontology in Madagascar
Formations